A Spalding Hi-Bounce Ball, often called a Spaldeen or a Pensie Pinkie, is a rubber ball, described as a tennis ball core without the felt. These balls are commonly used in street games developed in the mid-20th century, such as Chinese handball (a variation on American handball), Australian Handball,  stoop ball, hit-the-penny (involving trying to make a penny flip on a sidewalk), butts up, handball, punchball, boxball, half-rubber, Wireball and stickball (variations of baseball).

Name
The term arose from a local pronunciation of "Spalding" in Brooklyn, with Spalding being the sporting goods company that produced the balls. The name has become so common that Spalding now uses it in marketing, and it is now a registered trademark. The ball is also known as a "Pensie Pinkie" or "Pennsy Pinky" referring to Penn Racquet Sports, another sporting goods manufacturer brand.

History
Spaldeens were popular with children from the 1930s through to the 1970s. The balls sold for 15 cents in the 1950s. In urban areas sparse in grass, Spaldeens became integral to many street games due to their bounciness and light weight. Players of these games at the time said of the spaldeen, if dropped from a person's eye height, it would rebound to half of their total height. Citing the declining popularity of stickball, Spalding took the ball off the market in 1979, but it returned in 1999 to much fanfare. After reintroducing spaldeens in 1999, Spalding sold more than 2 million in the first year.

In his memoir, New York Senator Chuck Schumer recalls playing slapball with spaldeens as a child growing up in Brooklyn, and refers to the baseball-inspired game and its bouncy ball as his era's video game.

Colors

Since its return in 1999 Spaldeens have been manufactured in a variety of colors in addition to pink. Some of them are black, blue, green, orange, purple, red, and yellow.

See also
Bouncing ball
Bouncy ball

Notes

External links 
 Spaldeen.com (Spalding's promotional site for the ball)

Balls
Ball games
Street games